Memphis Fire Department provides fire protection and emergency medical services to the city of Memphis, Tennessee.

History
The Memphis Fire Department got its start in 1846 when the first independent fire company was formed. It wasn't until 1859 when the department had its first fire chief.  In 1966 the department started to provide ambulance service with 6,561 calls in the first year alone.  The history and artifacts of the department are displayed at the Fire Museum of Memphis.

A replacement to Station 5 started construction in summer 2020 and was opened in fall 2021. The new station is located at 400 Adams, and houses the firefighting equipment from the old station. Command staff headquarters was moved into a separate building on Avery.

Stations and apparatus
Below is a list of all Memphis Fire Department fire stations and apparatus.

References

External links

 Official Website
 Unofficial Website
 
 

Fire departments in Tennessee
Memphis, Tennessee